Baltasar and Blimunda (1982) is a novel by the Nobel Prize-winning Portuguese author José Saramago.

It is an 18th-century love story intertwined with the construction of the Convent of Mafra, now one of Portugal's chief tourist attractions, as a background. Two young lovers interact naturally with historical characters including the composer and harpsichordist Domenico Scarlatti and the priest Bartolomeu de Gusmão, recognized today as an aviation pioneer, all in the shadow of the Inquisition. The lovers are always at center stage wrapped in Saramago's language, which ranges from short simple sentences to surrealistic, unpunctuated paragraphs that help to intensify both the action and the setting.

The book served as the basis for the opera Blimunda (1990), composed by Azio Corghi.

Critical reception
"Much reverberates in memory after reading this enchanting novel, but most of all the love story which soars over the rest of the action like a flute across a heavy orchestra. Mr. Saramago, a writer of sharp intelligence, keeps this love story under strict control, free of pathos or sentimentality. It is a love of, and on, this earth." – Irving Howe in The New York Times 1987.

References

External links 
The New York Times review of Baltasar and Blimunda, by Irving Howe
Los Angeles Times review of Baltasar and Blimunda, by Richard Eder

Novels by José Saramago
1987 novels
20th-century Portuguese novels
Novels set in the 18th century
Novels set in Portugal
Inquisition in fiction
Literary duos
Fictional Portuguese people